Erat or ERAT may be:
Martin Erat, Czech hockey player
Roman Erat, Czech hockey player
Ruth Erat, Swiss teacher, author, painter, and politician
Tuğrul Erat, Azerbaijani association footballer
Acronym for environmentally responsible air transport; see aviation and the environment